Hollywood 411 is an entertainment news and gossip television show that originally premiered on August 12, 2005, but later started on January 14, 2008, on the TV Guide Network and is hosted by Chris Harrison. The show was previously hosted by Madison Michele with guest hosts Marc Istook, Tanika Ray, and Rosanna Tavarez. The show includes celebrity interviews and previews of TV shows and movies.

References

External links
 

2005 American television series debuts
Entertainment news shows in the United States
Pop (American TV channel) original programming